Jaqueline Antonia Ferreira (born March 5, 1987) is a Brazilian weightlifter who competes in the −75 kg weight division. She placed eighth at the 2012 Olympics and qualified for the 2016 Rio Games. She won a silver medal in clean and jerk and a bronze in snatch at the 2014 Pan American Sports Festival.
She also won a bronze medal at the 2015 Pan American Games.

She represented Brazil at the 2020 Summer Olympics held in Tokyo, Japan. She competed in the women's 87 kg event.

References

External links 
 

1987 births
Living people
Sportspeople from Rio de Janeiro (city)
Brazilian female weightlifters
Olympic weightlifters of Brazil
Weightlifters at the 2012 Summer Olympics
Weightlifters at the 2016 Summer Olympics
Pan American Games bronze medalists for Brazil
Pan American Games medalists in weightlifting
Weightlifters at the 2015 Pan American Games
South American Games silver medalists for Brazil
South American Games medalists in weightlifting
Competitors at the 2010 South American Games
Weightlifters at the 2019 Pan American Games
Medalists at the 2015 Pan American Games
Weightlifters at the 2020 Summer Olympics
21st-century Brazilian women